Saints Peter and Paul Church in Strzegom, Poland (til 1945: Striegau, Germany), is a historic brick, Gothic minor basilica, located in Strzegom as part of the Diocese of Świdnica. Formerly, the basilica belonged to the Sovereign Military Order of Malta. Since 2002, the church serves as a minor basilica. It is the most prized heritage site of the town and is one of the largest churches in Lower Silesia (with a length of the nave at 76 metres, height of 26 m and a main building width of 26 m). An example of Lower Silesian Gothic architecture. the church is enriched with artisanal handicraft , mainly from the fourteenth and fifteenth-century. 

On September 22, 2012 the minor basilica was registered on the List of Historic Monuments of Poland.

References

Świdnica County
Basilica churches in Poland
Strzegom